John Power (born 26 August 1992) is an Irish hurler who played as a left corner-forward for the Kilkenny senior team.

Born in Carrickshock, County Kilkenny, Power first played competitive hurling during his schooling at St. Kieran's College. He arrived on the inter-county scene at the age of sixteen when he first linked up with the Kilkenny minor team before later joining the under-21 side. He made his senior debut during the 2014 championship. Since then he has become a regular member of the team and has won two All-Ireland medals and two Leinster medals.

At club level Power plays with Carrickshock.

His father, Richie Power Snr, and his brother, Richie Power Jnr, are also All-Ireland medallists with Kilkenny.

Playing career

Colleges

During his schooling at St. Kieran's College in Kilkenny, Power established himself as a key member of the senior hurling team. In 2010 he won his first Leinster medal following a 3-13 to 1-11 defeat of Dublin Colleges. On 3 April 2010 St. Kieran's faced Ardscoil Rís in the All-Ireland decider. Power's side trailed by five points as the game entered the final quarter, however, St. Kieran's staged a magnificent comeback, hitting 1-5 without reply including a Michael Brennan goal in the 51st minute, to claim a 2-11 to 2-8 victory. It was Power's first All-Ireland medal.

Power added a second successive Leinster medal to his collection in 2011, as St. Kieran's recorded a 3-7 to 0-7 victory over Castlecomer Community School. On 2 April 2011 St. Kieran's renewed their rivalry with Ardscoil Rís in the All-Ireland final. A Thomas O'Hanrahan goal deep into stoppage time secured a 2-10 to 1-11 victory for St. Kieran's and a second All-Ireland medal for Power.

Minor and under-21

Power first played for Kilkenny in 2009 when he joined the minor side. He won his first Leinster medal that year following Kilkenny's 1-19 to 0-11 trouncing of Wexford in the provincial decider. Galway provided the opposition in the subsequent All-Ireland decider on 5 September 2010. A devastating second quarter display was pivotal in powering the Westerners to a 2-15 to 2-11 victory.

In 2010 Power won a second Leinster medal following a 1-20 to 0-10 trouncing of Dublin. The subsequent All-Ireland decider on 4 September 2011 pitted Kilkenny against Clare. "The Cats" were made to work hard before securing a narrow 2-10 to 0-14 victory, giving Power an All-Ireland Minor Hurling Championship medal.

Two years later Power was a key member of the Kilkenny under-21 team. He won his sole Leinster medal that year following a 4-24 to 1-13 trouncing of Laois. Kilkenny later faced Clare in the All-Ireland decider on 15 September 2012. A powerful second-half display, in which they outscored Kilkenny by 1-10 to 0-4, saw Clare take their second ever All-Ireland title in the grade.

Senior

In 2014 Power established himself on the senior team. He subsequently collected his first National Hurling League medal, as Kilkenny secured a narrow one-point 2-25 to 1-27 extra-time victory over Tipperary. He subsequently secured a Leinster medal, as a dominant Kilkenny display gave "the Cats" a 0-24 to 1-9 defeat of Dublin. On 7 September 2014 Power was on the bench as Kilkenny drew with Tipperary in the All-Ireland decider. He was added to the starting fifteen for the subsequent replay on 27 September 2014. Goals from Power and his brother Richie inspired Kilkenny to a 2-17 to 2-14 victory. It was his first All-Ireland medal.

Power won a second successive Leinster medal in 2015 following a 1-25 to 2-15 defeat of Galway in the provincial decider. He was listed as a substitute when Kilkenny renewed their rivalry with Galway in the All-Ireland decider on 6 September 2015. The team struggled in the first half, however, a T. J. Reid goal and a dominant second half display, which limited Galway to just 1-4, saw Kilkenny power to a 1-22 to 1-18 victory. Power was introduced as a substitute for Ger Aylward and collected his second All-Ireland medal on the field of play.

Career statistics

Honours

Team

St. Kieran's College
All-Ireland Colleges Senior Hurling Championship (2): 2010, 2011
Leinster Colleges Senior Hurling Championship (2): 2010, 2011

Kilkenny
All-Ireland Senior Hurling Championship (2): 2014, 2015
Leinster Senior Hurling Championship (3): 2014, 2015, 2016
Leinster Under-21 Hurling Championship (1): 2012
All-Ireland Minor Hurling Championship (1): 2010
Leinster Minor Hurling Championship (1): 2009, 2010

Carrickshock Club 
Intermediate County champions 2016
Leinster Intermediate Club champions 2016
All Ireland Intermediate Club Champions 2016
Senior Hurling Shield 2017

References

1992 births
Living people
Carrickshock hurlers
UCD hurlers
Kilkenny inter-county hurlers
Hurling goalkeepers
All-Ireland Senior Hurling Championship winners